The Ikarus 451 is a family of research aircraft designs built in Yugoslavia in the 1950s, all sharing the same basic airframe, but differing in powerplants and cockpit arrangements. One member of the family Ikarus 451M became the first domestically-built jet aircraft to fly in Yugoslavia, on 25 October 1952.

Design and development
To research prone pilot cockpit arrangements and controls, the Government Aircraft Factories developed the Ikarus 232 Pionir, a small twin-engined low-wing monoplane, powered by 2x  Walter Mikron III  piston engines. An enlarged version of the Pionir was developed as the Type 451, powered by 2x  Walter Minor 6-III piston engines.

The first aircraft built under this designation was a propeller-driven aircraft that also accommodated the pilot in prone position. It was an otherwise conventional low-wing monoplane with retractable tailwheel undercarriage, the main units of which retracted backwards into the engine nacelles mounted below the wings. This flew in 1952, and by the end of the year was followed by the 451M (Mlazni – "Jet") which had conventional seating for the pilot and in place of the two Walter Minor 6-III inline engines of the original Ikarus 451 (which has two inverted Walter six-cylinder piston engines of  each, 6.7 m (22 ft) wingspan, a maximum speed of 335 km/h (182 knots) and a ceiling of 4750m (15,570 ft).) was fitted with Turbomeca Palas turbojets. In this version, the undercarriage retracted inwards. Provision was made to carry one 20 mm Hispano Suiza 404A cannon under the fuselage, plus six RS rockets under the wings. Further developments were aimed at developing a viable military aircraft from this basic design.

The S-451M Zolja ("Wasp") that flew in 1954 featured a stretched fuselage, folding wings, and redesigned engine nacelles, now in the same plane as the wing rather than being hung under them. It then served as the basis for the development of an armed version, the J-451MM Stršljen ("Hornet") intended for the close-support (Jurisnik) role. This differed from preceding designs in having a tricycle undercarriage, as well as Turbomeca Marbore engines with over twice the thrust of those used on earlier aircraft, and armament increased to two HS.404 cannon carried under the fuselage. It was also developed into the T-451MM Stršljen II single-seat acrobatic trainer.

No member of the family was produced in any number. The 451, 451M, and J-451MM are all preserved at the Museum of Aviation in Belgrade.

Variants

232 PionirA small twin-engined prone-pilot research aircraft, powered by 2x  Walter Mikron III  piston engines. (1 built)

S-451
A larger, more powerful version of the Pionir, powered by 2x  Walter Minor 6-III piston engines and also incorporating a prone pilot cockpit. (1 built)

S-451M
(Mlazni – Jet) Derived directly from the S-451 airframe, the S-451M substituted  Turbomeca Palas turbojet engines for the piston engines, in underslung nacelles at the same positions on the wing and conventional cockpit.

S-451M Zolja
(Zolja – Wasp) Flown in 1954, the S-451M Zolja featured a stretched fuselage, folding wings, and engine nacelles centred on the wing chordline. Powered by 2x  Turbomeca Palas 056A turbojet engines, the S-451M was used to set a world speed record in its class in 1960.

J-451MM Stršljen
 (J – Jurisnik – close support) (Stršljen – Hornet)The intended production close support version with tricycle undercarriage, Turbomeca Marbore engines and cannon armament. (1 built).

S-451MM Matica
(Matica – Queen bee) Two-seat trainer version, used for a world speed record in 1957.

T-451MM Stršljen II
A single seat aerobatic trainer, fitted with more ammunition and maximum ordnance weight was slightly increased.

Specifications (451M)

See also

 Ikarus 452

References

External links

 Ikarus S-451M (Specifications, photos, scheme...)
 Ikarus T-451M Stršljen ("Hornet") photo
 Ikarus S-451, 451M & S-451MM Matica ("Queen bee") photos
 Ikarus T-451M Stršljen ("Hornet") & T-451MM Stršljen II ("Hornet II") photos

Ikarus aircraft
1950s Yugoslav experimental aircraft
Prone pilot aircraft
Twinjets
Low-wing aircraft
Aircraft first flown in 1952